The Doctor of Physical Therapy and Master of Public Health dual degree (DPT-MPH) program offers the opportunity for physical therapy clinicians to pursue a doctoral-level education in combination with an integrated approach to health care.

A DPT-MPH program is aimed at teaching doctors to be strong leaders in preventive health care, as well as effective following a public health crisis. Graduates with a DPT-MPH can pursue careers in curriculum development for programs that treat people with chronic conditions as well as research and teaching of new methods of rehabilitation.

See also
List of physical therapy schools in the United States

References

Dual academic degrees
Medical degrees